Vilangu is a 1987 Indian Tamil-language film produced, written and directed by P. Jayadevi. The film stars Jaishankar in the lead role. It was released on 27 February 1987.

Plot 

DIG Jayaraman seeks to capture an international smuggler.

Cast 
 Jaishankar as DIG Jayaraman
 Arun Pandian as Babu
 Nizhalgal Ravi
 M. N. Nambiar as an international smuggler
 Sulakshana as Jayaraman's wife
 Ramya Krishnan as Kavitha
 Janagaraj
 Sathyaraj (guest appearance)

Production 
Vilangu was written, produced and directed by P. Jayadevi under Thulasi International.

Soundtrack 
The soundtrack was composed by Shyam and the lyrics were written by Vairamuthu.

Release and reception 
Vilangu was released on 27 February 1987. On the same day, N. Krishnaswamy of The Indian Express derided the film, saying, "The film tone is so bad in some stretches that it is almost like a bad video copy."

References

External links 
 

1980s Tamil-language films
1987 action thriller films
1987 directorial debut films
1987 films
Indian action thriller films